The Borremose bodies are three bog bodies that were found in the Borremose peat bog in Himmerland, Denmark. Recovered between 1946 and 1948, the bodies of a man and two women have been dated to the Nordic Bronze Age. In 1891, the Gundestrup cauldron was found in a nearby bog.

Borremose man

In 1946, Borremose man was discovered by peat diggers in the southernmost part of the Borremose peat bog. First thought to be a murder victim, the body was later determined to be a bog body. The body was found a half metre down beneath a layer of birch sticks. The body was naked and two sheepskin coats and a woven cap lay beside it.

Borremose Man was found with a  rope with a slipknot around his neck indicating death by strangulation. However, examination also revealed a crushing blow to the back of the skull and the right femur had been broken.

Borremose II

In 1947, a body was discovered in the Borremose bog about one kilometre away from the Borremose Man. The corpse is believed to be female, although decomposition made it difficult to be sure. In the immediate vicinity were birch branches; directly on the body were three approximately  birch poles of the same thickness. The skull was fractured and the brain was visible. The upper torso was naked while the lower body was covered by a cloak made of a four layered twill fabric and a fringed shawl. These two articles of clothing are now on display at the National Museum of Denmark in Copenhagen. It is uncertain if the body had been clothed at the time it had been deposited, because the clothing from plant materials such as flax fibers can be passed in the acidic peat. A leather cord with an amber bead and bronze plate were around the neck. The skull was crushed and the right leg was broken below the knee. The bones of an infant and a ceramic jar were lying nearby. Because the body was largely decayed, further forensic analysis was hampered. Later carbon dating placed the age of the remains to about 400 BCE.

Borremose Woman

Her approximate age range at the time of death was 20–35 years old. Borremose Woman was found lying face down, the body wrapped in a woolen garment. The scalp and hair on one side of the head had been separated; however, this was believed to be damage caused by the shovels of the peat diggers, not a cause of her death. The skull and face were crushed, and deterioration of the neck prevented detection of strangulation. Re-examination showed that the damage to the skull had happened after death and was caused by demineralization of the bones as well as pressure from the peat. Carbon dating set the body's age to ca. 770 (+/-100) BCE.

In 1984, a forensic examination of Borremose Woman was undertaken by Andersen and Geert Inger and Elisabeth Munksgaard of the Natural History Museum in Copenhagen. Their examination confirmed that damage to the scalp had not occurred before death. The scientists were unable to make any conclusion as to the cause of death whether by murder, suicide, accident or natural causes.

References

4th-century BC deaths
7th-century BC deaths
1946 archaeological discoveries
1947 archaeological discoveries
1948 archaeological discoveries
Archaeological discoveries in Denmark
Bog bodies
Date of birth unknown
Deaths by beating in Europe
Deaths by hanging
Germanic archaeological sites
Nordic Bronze Age